Osman Sobhani was an Indian politician . He was a Member of Parliament, representing Andhra Pradesh in the Rajya Sabha the upper house of India's Parliament as a member of the Indian National Congress.

References

Rajya Sabha members from Andhra Pradesh
Indian National Congress politicians from Andhra Pradesh
1895 births
1959 deaths